Anthony Francis Butala (born November 20, 1940) is an American singer.   He was the lead singer of the vocal group The Lettermen since 1958, although he has been retired since 2019. Butala is the last surviving of the original three members.  The Lettermen received a star on the Hollywood Walk of Fame in February 2020.

Early life
Butala was born in Sharon, Pennsylvania, of Croatian descent, the eighth of eleven children of Mary Ann (Ference) and John George Butala. He spent much of his early years on a farm owned by his grandparents, enjoying a rural upbringing which included deer hunting. Butala said in a radio interview that hunting in those days was done more out of survival, rather than sport as it is today.  He shot his first deer at the age of 12.

Career

Butala began his professional singing career in 1948, when he appeared on "Starlets on Parade", a Saturday morning show on KDKA radio in Pittsburgh. He quickly became a favorite in and around his hometown of Sharon during his pre-teen years.

In 1951, Butala's mother, who was a nurse, was called to California to assist her sister, who had been stricken with pneumonia and needed assistance with her children while she recovered. Butala's father, believing that there could be opportunities for his son on the West Coast, suggested that Tony accompany his mother to California, where he joined the Robert Mitchell Boys Choir and performed with the choir through 1954. His notable works during this period included providing the singing voice for Lost Boy Slightly in the Disney animated film Peter Pan (1953).

Butala's tenure with the boys' choir ended as his voice naturally changed as he entered his teen years. However, Mitchell, retained him as assistant choir director and paid for his private education as he continued his show business career. As a teenager, Butala sang with a quartet called "The Fourmost", which included Concetta Ingolia, who would later be known as Connie Stevens. Though the group would later disband, for Tony, it laid the foundation of what would become known as The Lettermen.

The first unofficial incarnation of The Lettermen came in 1958, with Butala, Mike Barnett, and Talmadge Russell, who would later be replaced by Jerry Paul. That same year, Gary Clark and Jimmy Blaine followed, and that combination made its first recording, but it was not successful. Butala tried again with two new singers, Bob Engemann and Jim Pike. This lineup brought the group its first success, as The Lettermen scored their first Top 40 hit at #13 on the US charts in 1961 with "The Way You Look Tonight". This cover of a 1936 song went gold in the U.S. The Lettermen's pop music chart success ended in 1969, but they continued to record and appear live in concert since then, and continue to enjoy success.

Business interests

Butala also owns Butala Vineyards, which he started from a Chatsworth, California ranch he purchased and planted grapes in, in 1969. Less than twenty years later, he purchased another ranch along the southern Vaca Mountain Range, which is the eastern border of the Napa Valley. He first began selling wine commercially in 1992 under the Castlebrooke label, and continues to produce both wine and grapes for other winemakers as well.

Personal life
Butala married the former Judith Ann Blaskovich in 1969. The marriage ended in divorce, but both remained friendly until Judith's death in a car accident on October 10, 2006, one day after her 60th birthday. Together they had four children: Anthony, Rebecca, Lisa and Regina, and five grandchildren.

References

External links
 
 Butala Vineyards 
 The Lettermen

1940 births
Living people
American male pop singers
American winemakers
Singers from California
Singers from Pennsylvania
People from Chatsworth, Los Angeles
People from Sharon, Pennsylvania
American people of Croatian descent
20th-century American singers
20th-century American male singers